Willie Dee Quinnie Jr. (October 3, 1980 – July 4, 2021) was an American gridiron football wide receiver. He was signed by the Oakland Raiders as an undrafted free agent in 2003. He played college football at UAB.

Quinnie was also a member of the Atlanta Falcons, San Diego Chargers, Green Bay Packers and Colorado Crush.

Quinnie died on July 4, 2021, at the age of 40.

References

External links
AFL bio
Hamilton Tiger-Cats bio

1981 births
Living people
American football wide receivers
American players of Canadian football
Canadian football wide receivers
Colorado Crush players
UAB Blazers football players
Oakland Raiders players
Atlanta Falcons players
Rhein Fire players
San Diego Chargers players
Hamilton Tiger-Cats players
Spokane Shock players
Milwaukee Mustangs (2009–2012) players
Alabama Vipers players
Players of American football from Alabama
People from Theodore, Alabama
Green Bay Packers players